Cranberry Glades — also known simply as The Glades — are a cluster of five small, boreal-type bogs in southwestern Pocahontas County, West Virginia, United States. This site is the headwaters of the Cranberry River, a popular trout stream, and is adjacent to the nearly  Cranberry Wilderness.

The Glades are a  grouping of peat bogs resembling some Canadian bogs. The gladed land is highly acidic and supports plants commonly found at higher latitudes, including cranberries, sphagnum moss, skunk cabbage, and two carnivorous plants (purple pitcher plant, sundew). The Glades serve as the southernmost home of many of the plant species found there.

The Glades have been the subject of much scientific study, especially during the 1930s, 1940s and 1950s.  Professor Maurice Brooks conducted studies in 1930, 1934, and 1945. The work of Strausbaugh (1934), Darlington (1943), and Core (1955) followed.

In 1974, the Cranberry Glades Botanical Area was designated a National Natural Landmark.

Geography and geology
The natural history of the Glades has been traced back at least 12,200 years. Apparently, a forest of conifer-northern hardwoods replaced tundra with the end of the last Ice Age. Over time the Glades formed into what it is today. Under the peat is a layer of algal ooze and the ooze by marl. Since a limestone source in the surrounding rocks is indicated, an ample source appears to be present in the underlying Hinton Formation, a circumstance that also has significant implications for the Glades' flora.

The area is not entirely a glade, but a bog or wetland covered with all sorts of decaying vegetation.  The peat and decaying organic matter is more than ten feet thick under the dense plant cover.  The ground is not as much as quicksand or swampy, but spongy.  It is in a high valley, about 3,300 to 3,400 feet (1,005 to 1,036 meters) above sea level, surrounded by the Cranberry, Kennison, and Black Mountains.

Five separate glades were identified and named in 1911 — Big Glade (59 acres), Flag Glade (28 acres), Long Glade (20 acres), Round Glade (8 acres) and Little Glade (1 acre). The smallest, Little Glade, has since grown over and is no longer recognizable.

Darlington's studies showed that the Glades were formed by easily eroding rocks in the basin and more resistant rock at its lower end. This effectively prevented down-cutting and maintained a low gradient in the valley.

The water from the Glades drains to form the headwaters of the Cranberry River, a popular trout stream joined by the Yew and Charles Creeks.

Ecology

Flora
Many of the plants found in the Glades resemble those in the northern region of North America. They are descendants of seeds that took root over ten thousand years ago before the last glacial retreat. Among these are two unusual species of carnivorous plants that thrive in the area — the purple pitcher plant and native sundew. They evolved carnivorous habits because of the scarce root food in the spongy soil. Two very rare boreal plants — bog rosemary and buckbean — also live in the  Big Glade. Much of the area provides a home for many species of mosses. These include a cover of sphagnum moss, bird-wheat moss, bog moss and reindeer lichen. Over top of these grow prostrate cranberry vines that bloom nice pink flowers in the summer and a bunch of fruits in late September.

Trees
Within the Glades floodplain, most tree species occur in the "bog forest" habitat, which is composed primarily of a mixture of red spruce, eastern (or Canada) hemlock, yellow birch and red maple.  The upland forests immediately surrounding the wetlands are dominated by these same species, but also include American beech, sugar maple, black cherry, American basswood, white ash, yellow buckeye, black birch, cucumber tree, Fraser magnolia, and northern red oak.

Shrubs
The Glades' shrub layer, unlike the tree layer, is relatively species-rich.  This is a consequence of the widespread presence of low- to medium-height woody plants throughout shrub swamps, forest habitats, and open glades.  In the fringes of open glades and along streams, the dominant species is usually speckled alder.  Also common are willow, pipestem, glade St. Johns-wort, great rhododendron, hobblebush, smooth arrowwood, wild raisin, ninebark, alternate-leaved dogwood, bunchberry, winterberry holly, mountain holly, swamp rose, the Appalachian endemic longstalked holly and many more.  Most of these shrubs have markedly northern distributions, and bog rosemary and oblongfruited serviceberry are at their southernmost limits of distribution.   The Canada yew is an uncommon evergreen shrub that was historically reported as abundant in the area.  Nearby Yew Creek is presumably named for this species, as may be the broader Yew Mountains region in which the Glades are located.  Browsing deer have reduced the number of Canada yew to such an extent that it is found only in scattered locations throughout its Central Appalachian range, including here.

Herbs
Many herbs with primarily northern distributions occur here, including oak fern, pod grass (collected in 1909), Canada mayflower, mountain bindweed, marsh marigold, goldthread, swamp saxifrage, white wood sorrel, northern white violet, Jacob's ladder and buckbean.  Jacob's ladder is at its southernmost location. Grasses and sedges found here include blue joint, drooping wood reed grass, millet grass, rattlesnake mannagrass, interior sedge, and Fraser's sedge. Wild lilies in the Glades include yellow clintonia and white hellebore. Several species of orchids also grow here, such as the rose pogonia, lesser rattlesnake plantain, northern coralroot, and grass-pink orchid that are in full bloom in July. Northern (or early) coralroot is probably at its southernmost location in the eastern United States.

Fauna
Many animals that live in the Glades are at their southernmost breeding grounds, including birds such as the Swainson’s and hermit thrushes, Nashville and mourning warblers, and purple finches.  Other, less exotic, birds like ravens and hawks are common. Other familiar animals including whitetail deer inhabit the Glades.  Black bears have been seen in the skunk cabbage growing along the boardwalk.  In the evening, you have a good chance of hearing beavers working; they are mostly inactive during the day.  It is hard to see the beavers because of little light, and they are dark colored.  They also reside submerged or are building their homes.

Weather
Like many of the adjoining areas high in the Alleghenies, Cranberry Glades is known for frequent weather changes.  Generally speaking, the area is cool and wet, comparable to the climates of New England and Canada. This is due to its high elevation and the surrounding higher mountains forming a bowl, draining their cool air downhill into the Glades.

Due to the high elevation, the potential for frost exists year-round at Cranberry Glades. In some years, the frost-free period has been as short as 81 days. Still, the average summer high is in roughly 74 °F-82 °F (23 °C-28 °C).

Recreation
Today, Cranberry Glades serves as a major tourism stop along the Highland Scenic Highway corridor.  Near the Glades is the Cranberry Mountain Nature Center providing interpretive services. Within the Glades area itself, Monongahela National Forest has constructed a  boardwalk that traverses the edge of some bogs and a small wooded section. The entire Glades area itself is traversed by Cowpasture Trail, a  improved hiking path that serves as the border between the Cranberry Glades Botanical Area and the much larger Cranberry Wilderness. Due to the ecologically-sensitive nature of the area, visitors are not permitted to leave these developed paths within the Glades.

See also 
 List of botanical gardens and arboretums in West Virginia
Cranberry Wilderness
Cranberry River
Mill Point Federal Prison
List of National Natural Landmarks
List of National Natural Landmarks in West Virginia

References

External links

Monongahela National Forest: Cranberry Glades Botanical Area
Monongahela National Forest: Cranberry Mountain Nature Center
West Virginia Division of Natural Resources: Cranberry Glades page
National Park Service: NNL Webpage on the Glades
Eastern Panhandle Native Plant Society: Cranberry Glades Plant List (2001)

Appalachian bogs
Bogs of West Virginia
Botanical gardens in West Virginia
Monongahela National Forest
Protected areas of Pocahontas County, West Virginia
National Natural Landmarks in West Virginia
Landforms of Pocahontas County, West Virginia
Cranberries